Hasan Basri Durin (January 15, 1935 – July 9, 2016) was an Indonesian politician and military officer. He served as the Governor of West Sumatra for two terms from 1987 to 1997. In 1998, Indonesia President B. J. Habibie appointed Durin to his Development Reform Cabinet as State Minister of Agrarian Affairs.

Durin was born in Nagari Jaho, located in Padang Panjang, Tanah Datar Regency, West Sumatra, in the Dutch East Indies (present-day Indonesia) on January 15, 1935.

Durin served as the Mayor of Padang, the capital of West Sumatra, for two consecutive terms from 1971 until 1983. He was then appointed Governor of West Sumatra for two terms from October 1987 until November 1997.

In 1998, Durin was appointed Minister of Agrarian Affairs within the Development Reform Cabinet of President B. J. Habibie. He served in that post within the Habibie administration from May 21, 1998, to October 20, 1999.

Hasan Basri Durin died at a private hospital in Pancoran, South Jakarta, on July 9, 2016. He had been hospitalized since March 21, 2016. He was survived by his four children and eleven grandchildren.

Durin was buried in Kalibata Heroes Cemetery in South Jakarta.

References

1935 births
2016 deaths
Government ministers of Indonesia
Governors of West Sumatra
Mayors of Padang
Minangkabau people
People from Tanah Datar Regency
Mayors of places in Indonesia